Robert Brooks (born July 13, 1965) is an American businessman and Republican politician from Saukville, Wisconsin. He is state representative for the 60th district of the Wisconsin State Assembly, since January 2015.

Biography
Born in Rockford, Illinois, Brooks moved with his parents to Wisconsin and graduated from Parkview High School in Orfordville, Wisconsin.  He went on to attend the University of Wisconsin–La Crosse, but did not graduate.  He went to work in the real estate business, and owned a number of restaurants, taverns, and rental properties.  Since 1996, he has managed his real estate through Brooks Investment Group LLC.

Political career
From 2002 through 2014, Brooks was an elected member of the Ozaukee County Board of Supervisors; he was chairman from 2004 through 2013.  While serving on the county board, he was a commissioner on the South Eastern Wisconsin Regional Planning Commission and was a member of the board of directors of the Wisconsin Mutual Insurance Company.

In 2014, incumbent State Representative Duey Stroebel announced he would run for United States House of Representatives rather than seek another term in the Assembly.  Brooks jumped into the race for the open seat in the Wisconsin State Assembly.  In the Republican primary, he defeated Jean Opitz, the wife of former State Representative David W. Opitz.  He was unopposed in the general election, and went on to begin his term in January 2015.  He went on to win reelection in 2016 by a wide margin, with only an independent opponent.

In the 2017–2018 session of the Assembly, Brooks was elected by his caucus as the assistant majority leader.  However, he ran into problems in 2018 when the Milwaukee Journal Sentinel reported that Brooks had made "sexual comments to two female state lawmakers and a racial remark to a Latina legislator".  Brooks attributed the comments to the influence of alcohol, apologized, and resigned his leadership position in the assembly.  Republican Governor Scott Walker, in the middle of his own reelection campaign, called for Brooks to resign from the Assembly.  Despite the pressure from inside his own party, Brooks resisted calls to resign and was reelected in the 2018 general election.

He faced his first primary challenge as an incumbent in 2020, but Brooks prevailed again, taking 75% of the Republican primary vote.  He was again unopposed in the 2020 general election.

Electoral history

References

External links
 
 
 Robert Brooks at WisconsinVote.org

1965 births
Living people
Politicians from Rockford, Illinois
People from Saukville, Wisconsin
University of Wisconsin–La Crosse alumni
Businesspeople from Wisconsin
County supervisors in Wisconsin
Republican Party members of the Wisconsin State Assembly
21st-century American politicians